The 1990–91 European Cup was the 36th season of the European Cup, a tournament for men's football clubs in nations affiliated to the Union of European Football Associations (UEFA). It was won for the first time by Red Star Belgrade on penalties in the final against Marseille; both were first-time finalists. This was only the second time that an Eastern European side had won the competition, after Steaua București of Romania in 1986. It was also the last tournament to be solely knock-out based, with a group stage added for the next season. Red Star won the tournament as the only Yugoslavian club shortly before the breakup of Yugoslavia. This was also the last season to feature a team from East Germany, since the East and its West counterpart reunified in October 1990.

Although 1990–91 marked the return of English clubs to the Cup Winners' Cup and UEFA Cup, after a five-year ban resulting from the Heysel Stadium disaster, Liverpool had been banned for an additional year, so could not participate in the European Cup as English champions.

Ajax, the Dutch champions, were not allowed to participate in a European Cup competition because of the poor behaviour of their fans during a game the previous season, so their spot in the qualification was simply vacated, giving the two-time defending champions Milan a first-round bye.

Milan were eliminated by Marseille in the quarter-finals after the second leg had been awarded as a 3–0 win for Marseille when the eventual runners-up were leading 1–0, and 2–1 on aggregate, in injury time, when the floodlights failed. Milan refused to play on when floodlights were fixed and were banned, giving Marseille a 3–0 automatic win.

Teams
A total of 31 teams participated in the competition.

Notes

First round

|}

First leg

Second leg

Bayern Munich won 7–2 on aggregate.

Rangers won 10–0 on aggregate.

Real Madrid won 10–1 on aggregate.

CSKA Sofia won 3–1 on aggregate.

Dinamo București won 5–1 on aggregate.

Porto won 13–1 on aggregate.

Red Star Belgrade won 5–2 on aggregate.

Dynamo Dresden won 6–1 on aggregate.

Malmö FF won 5–4 on aggregate.

Napoli won 5–0 on aggregate.

Spartak Moscow won 4–0 on aggregate.

Swarovski Tirol won 7–1 on aggregate.

Club Brugge won 3–1 on aggregate.

Lech Poznań won 5–1 on aggregate.

Marseille won 5–1 on aggregate.

Second round

|}

First leg

Second leg

Bayern Munich won 7–0 on aggregate.

Porto won 4–0 on aggregate.

Red Star Belgrade won 4–1 on aggregate.

2–2 on aggregate. Dynamo Dresden won 5–4 on penalties.

0–0 on aggregate. Spartak Moscow won 5–3 on penalties.

Real Madrid won 11–3 on aggregate.

Milan won 1–0 on aggregate.

Marseille won 8–4 on aggregate.

Quarter-finals

|}

1 – Match abandoned due to rioting after 78 mins. With Red Star Belgrade leading 2–1, they were awarded the match 3–0.

2 – With the score at 1–0 to Marseille during stoppage time at the end of the second half, the floodlights failed. Milan refused to play on when lighting was restored and Marseille were awarded the match 3–0.

First leg

Second leg

Bayern Munich won 3–1 on aggregate.

The match was abandoned in the 78th minute as per the decision by the match referee Emilio Soriano Aladrén due to Dynamo Dresden fans causing commotion in the stands and pelting the pitch with objects that landed in the vicinity of Red Star player Robert Prosinečki who was about to take a corner kick and the assistant referee on the sideline. Following several minutes of unsuccessful attempts to calm the fans, the match referee ordered the teams off the pitch and the contest was never resumed. Red Star Belgrade led 2–1 on the night and 5–1 on aggregate at the moment of the stoppage. At a disciplinary hearing several days later, UEFA awarded a 3–0 win to Red Star Belgrade and banned Dynamo Dresden for a year from European competition.Red Star Belgrade won 6–0 on aggregate.

Spartak Moscow won 3–1 on aggregate.

The match was interrupted in injury time due to poor visibility after two of the four floodlights in the stadium failed. Marseille led 1–0 on the night and 2–1 on aggregate at the moment. When power was restored after 15 minutes, Milan director Adriano Galliani decided not to let his team go back on the pitch at which point the contest was abandoned permanently. UEFA awarded a 3–0 win to Marseille and banned Milan for a year from European competition including suspending Galliani from all official club functions for two years.Marseille won 4–1 on aggregate.

Semi-finals

|}

First leg

Second leg

Red Star Belgrade won 4–3 on aggregate.

Marseille won 5–2 on aggregate.

Final

Top scorers
The top scorers from the 1990–91 European Cup are as follows:

References

External links
1990–91 All matches – season at UEFA website
European Cup results at Rec.Sport.Soccer Statistics Foundation
 All scorers 1990–91 European Cup according to protocols UEFA

1990–91 in European football
European Champion Clubs' Cup seasons